Razorback Mountain is a mountain located within British Columbia, Canada. It is the highest peak of the Niut Range, a subrange of the Coast Mountains.

Razorback Mountain was first climbed in 1931 by Henry S. Hall and Hans Fuhrer.

See also
 List of Ultras of North America
 Mountain peaks of Canada
 List of the most prominent summits of North America
 Highest mountain peaks of Canada

References

External links
 "Razorback Mountain, British Columbia" on Peakbagger
 Razorback Mountain, northeast aspect: Flickr (photo)

Three-thousanders of British Columbia
Pacific Ranges
Range 2 Coast Land District